Mark Murray is the name of:
Mark Murray (rugby league) (born 1959), Australian rugby league footballer and coach
Mark Murray (administrator), American government, academic and business administrator